Eggysodon is an extinct genus of odd-toed ungulate belong to the rhinoceros-like family Eggysodontidae. It was a small, ground-dwelling browser, and fossils have been found in Oligocene deposits throughout Europe.  Eggysodon may have been related to Preaceratherium, and both had tusklike canines and smaller, and fewer, incisors.

Allacerops (=Teniseggysodon), a close relative of Eggysodon, was synonymized with Eggysodon by Heissig (1989), but is now considered a distinct genus.

References

Oligocene rhinoceroses
Oligocene mammals of Europe
Hyracodonts
Prehistoric mammal genera